Kingston or Kingston-upon-Thames was a parliamentary constituency which covered the emerging southwest, outer London suburb of Kingston upon Thames (until 1965 in Surrey) and which existed between 1885 and 1997 and returned one Member of Parliament (MP) to the House of Commons of the UK Parliament.  The Conservative candidate won each election during its 112-year existence.

History
The seated was created for the 1885 general election as a county division called Kingston equivalent to the northwest corner of the former two-seat Mid Surrey division. It became a borough constituency for the present purposes of election expenses and type of returning officer at the 1918 general election, when it was formally renamed Kingston-upon-Thames.

It was abolished for the 1997 general election. Its territory was then divided between the new constituencies of Kingston and Surbiton and Richmond Park.

The constituency's most high-profile MP was the Conservative Norman Lamont, who was Chancellor of the Exchequer from 1990 to 1993.

Boundaries
1983–1997: The London Borough of Kingston upon Thames wards of Burlington, Cambridge, Canbury, Coombe, Grove, Hill, Malden, Manor, Norbiton, Norbiton Park, St James, and Tudor.

The seat since 1950 omitted all southern wards of Kingston upon Thames. These fell into the 1950-established seat of Surbiton, which replicated its own borough that merged with Kingston's borough in 1965.

Members of Parliament

Elections

Elections in the 1880s

Elections in the 1890s

Elections in the 1900s

Elections in the 1910s 

General Election 1914–15:

Another General Election was required to take place before the end of 1915. The political parties had been making preparations for an election to take place and by July 1914, the following candidates had been selected; 
Unionist: George Cave
Liberal:

Elections in the 1920s 

* Day was supported by the local Labour and Liberal parties.

Elections in the 1930s 

General Election 1939–40

Another General Election was required to take place before the end of 1940. The political parties had been making preparations for an election to take place and by the Autumn of 1939, the following candidates had been selected; 
Conservative: Percy Royds
Labour: Dennis Gordon
Liberal: Henry Cecil Banting

Elections in the 1940s

Elections in the 1950s

Elections in the 1960s

Elections in the 1970s

Elections in the 1980s

Elections in the 1990s

References

Parliamentary constituencies in London (historic)
Politics of the Royal Borough of Kingston upon Thames
Constituencies of the Parliament of the United Kingdom established in 1885
Constituencies of the Parliament of the United Kingdom disestablished in 1997